Brit Air (short for Brittany Air International) was a regional airline based at Morlaix Airport in Ploujean, Morlaix, Brittany, France, operating scheduled services as an Air France franchise from Lyon–Saint Exupéry Airport, Paris-Orly Airport and Paris-Charles de Gaulle Airport.

The airline, along with Régional and Airlinair, was fully merged in HOP! since 2017 after a year of negotiation process.

History
Since 31 March 2013, all Brit Air flights are operated under HOP! name, Air France's new regional brand name.

Brit Air ceased all flight operations in March 2017 after its merger in HOP!.

Destinations
Brit Air operated the following services (as of March 2013):

Fleet
In August 2019, the Brit Air fleet consisted of the following aircraft with an average age of 10.6 years:

Fleet development
Over the years, the airline has operated various aircraft types including:

Incidents and accidents
On 22 June 2003, Air France Flight 5672 from Nantes to Brest, which was operated by a Brit Air CRJ-100, crashed 2.3 miles short of the runway when attempting to land at Brest Bretagne Airport at 23:55 local time, resulting in the death of the captain. The aircraft involved (registered F-GRJS) subsequently caught fire (after all 21 passengers on board had been evacuated) and was damaged beyond repair. The most probable cause of the accident was declared to be pilot error, as the instrument approach had not been executed correctly.

References

External links

Official website  (Archive)
Brit Air Souffle & Passion  (Archive)
Bureau d'Enquêtes et d'Analyses pour la Sécurité de l'Aviation Civile on Air France Flight 5672
Final report (Full final English report)
 Final report (PDF)
 Preliminary report (PDF)

Defunct airlines of France
Former SkyTeam affiliate members
Airlines established in 1973
Airlines disestablished in 2017
European Regions Airline Association
Air France–KLM
French companies established in 1973
French companies disestablished in 2017